The Madonna and Child with Sts Jerome and Mary Magdalen (The Day) is an oil on canvas painting by the Italian Renaissance artist Correggio dating from around 1528 and housed in the Galleria Nazionale of Parma, Italy.

History
The canvas was commissioned in 1523 by Briseide Colla for a private chapel on the right side of the church of Sant'Antonio Abate in Parma. Contemporary art historian and painter Giorgio Vasari described the work's il mirabile colorito ("wonderful color"), and it was also studied by El Greco.

In the early 18th century, the church needed costly restoration works and several collectors, including the Kings of Poland and France and the Holy Roman Emperor, offered to buy the work. However, in 1749 it was transferred into the Cathedral of Parma and later was bought by the Duchy of Parma. During the French occupation of northern Italy, it was stolen and brought to France. The painting was returned to Italy in 1815 and placed on display in the Parma gallery. A 1724 copy of the painting hangs in the chapel of Palais Rohan, Strasbourg.

Sources

External links
Page at  Correggio Art Home website 
Page at Galleria nazionale di Parma website 

Jerome
1528 paintings
Collections of the Galleria nazionale di Parma
Corregio
Lions in art
Angels in art
Paintings depicting Mary Magdalene